Bart Joris Tommelein (born 4 May 1962) is a Belgian politician of Open Vld who was minister in the Bourgeois Government and is the incumbent mayor of Ostend.

Career
Bart Tommelein was born in Ostend on 4 May 1962.

He started in the People's Union (Volksunie); he was chairman of the People's Union Youth (Volksunie Jongeren) from 1985 until 1990. However, he became member of the VLD in 1999.

He was member of the Chamber of Representatives from 2003 until 2009, where he was political group leader from 2008 to 2009. In 2009 he was elected to the Flemish Parliament, where he became political group leader in 2013.

In October 2014 Tommelein became Secretary of State for Social fraud, Privacy and the North Sea in the Michel Government.

On 4 May 2016 he succeeded Annemie Turtelboom as Vice Minister-President and Flemish Minister for Finance, Budget and Energy in the Bourgeois Government. He resigned from this position in November 2018 to be able to become mayor of Ostend, a position he took up in January 2019.

References

External links
 
 Bart Tommelein, Flemish Parliament

Living people
1962 births
Government ministers of Flanders
Politicians from Ostend
Open Vlaamse Liberalen en Democraten politicians
21st-century Belgian politicians